Jack Halberstam (born December 15, 1961), previously known as Judith Halberstam, is an American academic and author. Since 2017, Halberstam has been a professor in the department of English and comparative literature and the Institute for Research on Women, Gender, and Sexuality at Columbia University. Previously, Halberstam was a professor of American studies and ethnicity, gender studies, and comparative literature, and the director of The Center for Feminist Research at University of Southern California (USC). Halberstam was the Associate Professor in the Department of Literature at the University of California at San Diego before working at USC. Halberstam is a gender and queer theorist and author.

Halberstam's writings focus on the topic of tomboys and female masculinity in the 1998 book, Female Masculinity, which discusses a common by-product of gender binarism, termed "the bathroom problem.″ This outlines the awkward and dangerous dilemma of a perceived "gender deviant's" justification of presence in a gender-policed zone, such as a public bathroom, and the identity implications of "passing" therein. Assigned female at birth, Halberstam is unspecific in preferred pronouns, but uses the preferred name  "Jack" publicly and professionally.

Halberstam lectures in the United States and internationally on queer failure, sex and media, subcultures, visual culture, gender variance, popular film and animation. Halberstam is currently working on several projects including a book on fascism and (homo)sexuality.

Early life, education and gender identity 
Halberstam earned a B.A. in English at the University of California, Berkeley in 1985, an M.A. from the University of Minnesota in 1989, and a Ph.D. from the same school in 1991. Halberstam is Jewish, with family history in Bohemia.

Halberstam goes by the name "Jack", and is "loosey goosey" and a "free floater" when it comes to gender identity/binary conformity and pronoun-usage. Halberstam has said that "some people call me Jack, my sister calls me Jude, people I've known forever call me Judith" and "I try not to police any of it. A lot of people call me he, some people call me she, and I let it be a weird mix of things." Halberstam says that "the back and forth between he and she sort of captures the form that my gender takes nowadays" and that the floating gender pronouns have captured Jack's refusal to resolve gender ambiguity. Jack does, however, say that "grouping me with someone else who seems to have a female embodiment and then calling us 'ladies', is never, ever ok!"

Career

Female Masculinity
In Female Masculinity (1998), Halberstam seeks to identify what constitutes masculinity in society the individual. The text first suggests that masculinity is a construction that promotes particular brands of male-ness while at the same time subordinating "alternative masculinities." The project specifically focuses on the ways female masculinity has been traditionally ignored in academia and society at large. To illustrate a cultural mechanism of subordinating alternative masculinities, Halberstam brings up James Bond and GoldenEye as an example, noting that gender performance in this film is far from what is traditional: M is the character who "most convincingly performs masculinity," Bond can only perform masculinity through his suave clothing and gadgets, and Q can be read "as a perfect model of the interpenetration of queer and dominant regimes." This interpretation of these characters challenges long-held ideas about what qualities create masculinity. Halberstam also brings up the example of the tomboy, a clear case of a youthful girl exerting masculine qualities—and raises the complication that within a youthful figure, the idea of masculinity expressed within a female body is less threatening, and only becomes threatening when those masculine tendencies are still apparent as the child progresses in age.

Halberstam then focuses on "the bathroom problem." Here, the question of the gender binary is brought up. Halberstam argues it is an issue when there are two separate bathrooms for different genders, with no place for people who do not clearly fit into the binary. The problem of policing that occurs around the bathrooms is also a focal point for examination of the bathroom problem as not only is this a policing on the legal level, but also on the social level. According to Halberstam, the social aspect makes it even more difficult for people who do not adhere to binary standards to use public restrooms without encountering some sort of uncomfortable, or even violent, situation.

The Queer Art of Failure

In The Queer Art of Failure (2011), Halberstam argues that failure can be a productive way of critiquing capitalism and heteronormativity. Using examples from popular culture, like Pixar animated films, Halberstam explores alternatives to individualism and conformity. L. Ayu Saraswati calls The Queer Art of Failure "a groundbreaking book that retheorizes failure and its relationship to the process of knowledge production and being in the world."

Gaga Feminism
In Gaga Feminism Halberstam uses Lady Gaga as a symbol for a new era of sexual and gender expression in the 21st century. The book has been noted as "a work that engages in the theorizing of contemporary gender relations and their cultural narratives, and the practice of calling for a chaotic upending of normative categories in an act of sociopolitical anarchy." Halberstam describes the five tenets of Gaga feminism:

Wisdom lies in the unexpected and the unanticipated.
Transformation is inevitable, but don't look for the evidence of change in the everyday; look around, look on the peripheries, the margins, and there you will see its impact.
Think counterintuitively, act accordingly.
Practice creative non-believing.
Gaga Feminism is outrageous ... impolite, abrupt, abrasive and bold. 

Halberstam uses contemporary pop culture examples such as SpongeBob SquarePants, Bridesmaids, and Dory from Finding Nemo to explore these tenets.

Other works
In a Queer Time and Place: Transgender Bodies, Subcultural Lives, published in 2005, looks at queer subculture, and proposes a conception of time and space independent of the influence of normative heterosexual/familial lifestyle.
Halberstam coedits the book series "Perverse Modernities" with Lisa Lowe.

Trans*: A Quick and Quirky Account of Gender Variability, published in 2018, examines recent developments in the meanings of gender and gendered bodies. Through dissecting gendered language and creations of popular culture, Halberstam presents a complex view of the trans* body and its place in the modern world.

Personal life
Halberstam is one of six children. Halberstam's father, Heini Halberstam, and mother, Heather Peacock, were married until Heather's death in a car accident in 1971.

Halberstam is attracted to women. After a relationship of 12 years, Halberstam has been romantically involved with a female sociology professor from Los Angeles, since 2008. Halberstam has said that he feels no pressure to marry, viewing marriage as a patriarchal institution that should not be a prerequisite for obtaining health care and deeming children "legitimate." Halberstam believes that "the couple form is failing".

Honors and awards
Halberstam has been nominated three times for Lambda Literary Awards, twice for the non-fiction book Female Masculinity.

Halberstam was awarded the Arcus/Places Prize in 2018 from Places Journal for innovative public scholarship on the relationship between gender, sexuality and the built environment.

Books
Halberstam, Judith and Ira Livingston, Eds. Posthuman Bodies. Bloomington: Indiana University Press, 1995.  & 0253209706
Halberstam, Judith. Skin Shows: Gothic Horror and the Technology of Monsters. Durham: Duke University Press, 1995.  & 0822316633
Halberstam, Judith. Female Masculinity. Durham: Duke University Press, 1998.  & 0822322439
Halberstam, Judith and Del LaGrace Volcano. The Drag King Book. London: Serpent's Tale, 1999. 
Halberstam, Judith. In a Queer Time and Place: Transgender Bodies, Subcultural Lives. New York: New York University Press, 2005.  & 0814735851
Halberstam, Judith, David Eng & José Esteban Muñoz, Eds. What's Queer about Queer Studies Now? Durham: Duke University Press, 2005. 
Halberstam, Judith. The Queer Art of Failure. Durham: Duke University Press, 2011.  & 978-0822350453
Halberstam, J. Jack.  Gaga Feminism. Boston: Beacon Press, 2012. 
Halberstam, Jack. Trans*: A Quick and Quirky Account of Gender Variability. Oakland: University of California Press, 2018. 
Halberstam, Jack.  Wild Things: The Disorder of Desire. Durham: Duke University Press, 2020.

Interviews
Damon R. Young, "Public Thinker: Jack Halberstam on Wildness, Anarchy, and Growing Up Punk." Public Books,  March 26, 2019.
Mathias Danbolt, "The Eccentric Archive - An Interview with Judith Halberstam" in Trikster – Nordic Queer Journal #1, 2008.
Podcast from Critical Lede October 5, 2011
Interview with Halberstam by Sinclair Sexsmith February 1, 2012
Interview with Halberstam by Elizabeth Heineman on Feb 3, 2012 (archived)

References

External links
 
 Interview with Peter Shea at the Institute for Advanced Study at the University of Minnesota, June 2010
 500 Words essay in Art Forum October 17, 2011
 Trans* Bodies Lecture by Jack Halberstam at Centre de Cultura Contemporània de Barcelona

1961 births
20th-century American non-fiction writers
21st-century American non-fiction writers
American academics of English literature
American drag kings
Columbia University faculty
Duke University faculty
Gender studies academics
Jewish American academics
Jewish American writers
Jewish feminists
Jewish philosophers
LGBT Jews
LGBT academics
LGBT philosophers
American LGBT writers
Living people
Postmodern feminists
Queer feminists
Queer theorists
Transgender studies academics
University of California, Berkeley alumni
University of Minnesota alumni
University of Southern California faculty
LGBT educators